Hausa Sign Language (HSL) or Maganar Hannu is the indigenous sign language of the Deaf community in northern Nigeria.

Overview 
There are no statistics on the number of deaf people in northern Nigeria or in Nigeria in general or on the number of people who use Hausa Sign Language. Estimates as to the number of signers using this language "vary greatly, from 70,000 to five million".

There is no information on the origin of Hausa Sign Language, but it is believed that deaf people have always used HSL for communication. Hausa Sign Language is not taught formally in schools but is handed down from one generation to the next. Deaf children learn it from their parents, from their peers or other members of the deaf community. HSL is constantly enriched whenever deaf people meet, whether informally or in schools, associations or other groups.

Linguistic structure 
Hausa Sign Language is a language in its own right with its own lexicon and grammar. It can be analysed linguistically like other spoken and sign languages. The HSL lexicon does, however, include loanwords from spoken Hausa, the surrounding major spoken language. Even though HSL grammar differs from spoken Hausa language grammar, there are influences from the spoken language in some users.

HSL signs are articulated by the hands. Each sign is composed of a number of components that are called the manual parameters, i.e. handshape, orientation, movement, and location. A sign may be articulated by one hand or both. Body posture and movement as well as facial expressions and other non-manual parameters play a role as well. They may be inherent parts of signs but may also be used to express grammatical features, e.g. question markers and emphasis.

References

External links 
Website with all signs

Further reading
Hausa SL dictionaries:
Schmaling, Halima C. 2022. Maganar hannu: Harshen bebaye na kasar Hausa. Littafi na tara: Addini. Hamburg: Buske.  [Hausa Sign Language, Book 9: Religion.] 
Schmaling, Halima C. 2020. Maganar hannu: Harshen bebaye na kasar Hausa. Littafi na farko: Iyali. Hamburg: Buske.  [Hausa Sign Language, Book 1: Family.] (2nd rev. and ext. ed.)
Schmaling, Halima C. 2019. Maganar hannu: Harshen bebaye na kasar Hausa. Littafi na takwas: Kayan gida. Hamburg: Buske. [Hausa Sign Language. Book 8: Things in the house.]
Schmaling, Halima C. 2018. Maganar hannu: Harshen bebaye na kasar Hausa. Littafi na bakwai: Ilmi. Hamburg: Buske. [Hausa Sign Language. Book 7: Education.]
Schmaling, Halima C. 2018. Maganar hannu: Harshen bebaye na kasar Hausa. Littafi na shida: Lokaci da yanayi. Hamburg: Buske. [Hausa Sign Language. Book 6: Time and weather.]
Schmaling, Halima C. 2017. Maganar  hannu: Harshen bebaye na kasar Hausa. Littafi na biyar: Ayyukan yau da kullum. Hamburg: Buske. [Hausa Sign Language. Book 5: Everyday activities.]
Schmaling, Halima C. 2016. Maganar hannu: Harshen bebaye na kasar Hausa. Littafi na hudu: Kasuwanci da kidaya. Hamburg: Buske.[Hausa Sign Language. Book 4: Commerce and counting.]
Schmaling, Halima C. 2016. Maganar hannu: Harshen bebaye na kasar Hausa. Littafi na uku: Kwatancin mutane da abubuwa. Hamburg: Buske. [Hausa SignLanguage, Book 3: Describing people and things.]
Schmaling, Halima C. 2014. Maganar hannu: Harshen bebaye na kasar Hausa. Littafi na biyu: Haduwa da sadarwa. Hamburg: Buske. [Hausa Sign Language, Book 2: Meeting and communicating.]
Schmaling, Halima C. and Bala Hausawa, Lawan. 2011. Maganar  hannu: Harshen bebaye na kasar Hausa. Littafi na farko: Iyali. Kano: Government Printers. [Hausa Sign Language, Book 1: Family.]
Other references:

 Schmaling, C. H. 2015. Hausa Sign Language. In Sign Languages of the world, ed. J. Bakken Jespen, G. de Clerck, S. Lutalo-Klingl, W.B. McGregor. Berlin (et al.): de Gruyter/Ishara, 361-389.
 Schmaling, C.H. 2012. Dictionaries of African sign languages: an overview. Sign Language Studies,12 (2), 236-278.

Schmaling, Constanze. 2003. A for Apple: The impact of Western education and ASL on the deaf community in Kano State, northern Nigeria. In Many ways to be deaf: international variation in Deaf communities, ed. L. Monaghan, C. Schmaling, K. Nakamura, G. Turner. Washington, DC: Gallaudet University Press, 302–310.
Schmaling, Constanze. 2001. ASL in Northern Nigeria: Will Hausa sign language survive. Signed languages: Discoveries from international research, ed. by Valerie Dively, 2001, 180–93. Gallaudet University Press.
Schmaling, Constanze. 2000. Maganar Hannu: Language of the hands. A descriptive analysis of Hausa Sign Language. Hamburg: Signum.

Sign language isolates
Sign languages of Nigeria